Vladimir Pavlovich Leontyev (4 November 1946 – 21 September 2005) was a Russian sailor. He competed in the Flying Dutchman class at the 1972, 1976 and 1980 Olympics and placed fifth-sixth. Domestically he won 11 Soviet titles in this event between 1969 and 1981.

Leontyev was born in a family of competitive sailors, and took up the sport in 1957. He graduated from the Institute of Physical Education in Yerevan, and after retiring from competitions worked as a sailing coach.

References

1946 births
2005 deaths
Soviet male sailors (sport)
Olympic sailors of the Soviet Union
Sailors at the 1972 Summer Olympics – Flying Dutchman
Sailors at the 1976 Summer Olympics – Flying Dutchman
Sailors at the 1980 Summer Olympics – Flying Dutchman